Neurexin-1-alpha is a protein that in humans is encoded by the NRXN1 gene.

Neurexins are a family of proteins that function in the vertebrate nervous system as cell adhesion molecules and receptors. They are encoded by several unlinked genes of which two, NRXN1 and NRXN3, are among the largest known human genes. 
Three of the genes (NRXN1-3) utilize two alternate promoters and include numerous alternatively spliced exons to generate thousands of distinct mRNA transcripts and protein isoforms. The majority of transcripts are  produced from the upstream promoter and encode alpha-neurexin isoforms; a much smaller number of transcripts are produced from the downstream promoter and encode beta-neurexin isoforms. The alpha-neurexins contain epidermal growth factor-like (EGF-like) sequences and laminin G domains, and have been shown to interact with neurexophilins. The beta-neurexins lack EGF-like sequences and contain fewer laminin G domains than alpha-neurexins.

Function
Neurexins are presynaptic membrane cell-adhesion molecules that bind primarily to neuroligins, proteins that have been associated with autism. Autism is characterized by a wide range of social and cognitive deficits, which are partially attributed to faulty synaptic communication between neurons. This lack of communication is oftentimes tied to mutations in NRXN1. Structural variants of NRXN1a (neurexin1 alpha) are consistent with mutations predisposing autism. These alpha neurexins are involved in communication through coupling mechanisms of calcium channels and vesicle exocytosis, to ensure that neurotransmitters are properly released. They are specifically required for glutamate and GABA release. Implications of neurexin involvement in autism have been determined through deletion in coding exons of NRXN1a, particularly in knockout mice models. These mice showed impaired social functioning, decreased motor response in new situations, and increased aggressive behavior in males. Social functioning was of major relevance for this gene and its association with autism spectrum disorder.

Genomics

The gene is found in a single copy on the short arm of chromosome 2 (2p16.3). The gene is 1,112,187 bases in length, is located on the Crick (minus) strand and encodes a protein of 1,477 amino acids (molecular weight 161.883 kDa).

Mutations of this gene that interrupt its expression have been associated with schizophrenia, autism, and intellectual disability (NRXN1 mutations and brain disorders).

Interactions
NRXN1 has been shown to interact with NLGN1.

References

Further reading

External links